KGWD is a broadcast radio station licensed to and serving Sioux Falls, South Dakota. KGWD is owned and operated by Real Presence Radio.

History
The station was previously owned by the University of Sioux Falls, with the call letters KCFS, and was purchased in September 2015 for the sum of 1.5 million dollars. The call sign was changed on September 1, 2015 to KBAD-FM.

The station permanently ceased operation on September 23, 2017 and was advertised for sale, citing result of on-going litigation between then-owner Chuck Brennan and his other Dollar Loan Center businesses against the state of South Dakota, related to recent lending laws ruling according to press release published on http://www.kbad945.com/.

Effective June 21, 2018, Brennan's Badlands Airtime, LLC sold KBAD-FM to Real Presence Radio for $945,000. The new owners changed the station's call sign to KGWD on July 3, 2018.

Previous logos

References

External links
KGWD Online

1985 establishments in South Dakota
Talk radio stations in the United States
GWD
Radio stations established in 1985
GWD